Hawes Radio Relay Facility (also known as the Hawes Radio Tower) was a United States Air Force installation built on the site of the former Hawes Airfield at Hinkley, California, USA at . The site contained a  guyed mast antenna and hardened underground facility used for the Strategic Air Command's AN/FRC-117 Survivable Low Frequency Communications System. Detachment 2, 33rd Communications Group at March AFB, ran the site until its inactivation in 1986.

Mission
The mission of Detachment 2 (Hawes Radio Relay Site) was to provide the Joint Chiefs of Staff, the Commander-in-Chief of Strategic Air Command (CINCSAC), SAC Headquarters, the Airborne Command Post (ABNCP), and the SAC Force with a Survivable Low Frequency Communications System for passing record communications between the above agencies.  Hawes provided SAC Emergency War Order communications before, during and after a potential nuclear attack, acted as the alternate ground station for the SAC ABNCP, and relayed secure record communications with the Automatic Digital Network (AUTODIN).

History

Activation
The SAC SLFCS site at Hawes was activated on 3 Apr 1967 as a project assigned to the 33d Communications Squadron, Air Force. The site was accepted by Headquarters USAF on 31 May 1968, and was activated for continuous operations a day later. On 19 Jul 1968, 15th Air Force assumed maintenance responsibility.  Hawes was located in the Mojave Desert, approximately 100 miles northeast of March AFB, and 40 miles east of Edwards AFB.  Site personnel lived on Edwards AFB, and took a shuttle bus to the site.

Deactivation
During the Fiscal Year 1987-1991 Program Objective Memorandum development, Headquarters SAC, determined Hawes was no longer needed to perform the SLFCS mission.  HQ SAC Program Directive 01-85, titled "Hawes SLFCS Transmitter Site Deactivation", outlined the steps needed to shut the site down. On 30 September 1986, at 1601 local time (1 Oct 1986, 0001Z), the main power breaker for the transmitter was permanently turned off. Minutes before, Hawes transmitted one final SLFCS message, commemorating its 18 years of operation.

Facility
Hawes Radio Tower was a mast radiator insulated against ground, which provided VLF communication to ground and mobile nuclear missile facilities during the Cold War. It transmitted at a maximum power of 100 kW. The facility was partially built into the ground and was designed to withstand a moderate nuclear blast at a distance of 10 miles. The facility was self-sustaining, and employed a sophisticated ventilation system and backup diesel generators.

Post USAF operations
In the mid-1980s, the site was given up, and in 1986, the mast was demolished by explosives. The two-story bunker, left abandoned, became a popular hang-out site for local teenagers. It also  became a center for wild and sometimes violent parties. The interior was blackened from numerous bonfires and riddled with graffiti. In addition, holes and debris created by the radio tower demolition, as well as standing water in the basement after rains, made navigating the dark interior of the bunker extremely dangerous.

The bunker was demolished by the Bureau of Land Management and Air Force in April–May 2008 after two local teenagers, Christopher Cody Thompson of Apple Valley and Bodhisattva "Bodhi" Sherzer-Potter of Helendale, were found murdered in the bunker on January 5 after a robbery attempt. Collin Lee McGlaughlin was convicted and sentenced to life in prison without parole for the murder. A second defendant, Cameron Thomson, 22, also of Covina, pleaded guilty to two counts of voluntary manslaughter and two counts of attempted robbery after agreeing to a plea bargain and was sentenced to 15 years. A third suspect, David Brian Smith, was sentenced to 50 years to life in 2016.

See also
Strategic Air Command
Post Attack Command and Control System
Survivable Low Frequency Communications System
Silver Creek Communications Annex - sister site to Hawes, located in Silver Creek, Nebraska

Photo gallery

References

External links
 http://www.airfields-freeman.com/CA/Airfields_CA_PalmdaleN.htm
 http://ludb.clui.org/ex/i/CA4997/
 http://skyscraperpage.com/diagrams/?b63081
 http://www.mojavetreks.com/Hawes%20Journal%20Page%201.html  This is a very detailed photo blog with pictures of the facility when it was in use.
  Some pictures of the inside of the facility prior to demolition
 https://web.archive.org/web/20071023035041/http://community.livejournal.com/abandonedplaces/1032897.html More pictures from the same site

Cold War military history of the United States
Towers in California
Buildings and structures in San Bernardino County, California
United States nuclear command and control
History of San Bernardino County, California
Radio masts and towers in the United States
1967 establishments in California
1986 disestablishments in California
Installations of the United States Air Force in California
Installations of Strategic Air Command